Craig Huby (born 27 March 1986) is an English rugby league footballer.

Background
Huby was born in Pontefract, West Yorkshire, England in 1986.

Playing career
He made his début for his hometown club, Castleford Tigers, against Leeds Rhinos as a 17-year-old in May 2003. He established himself as a regular first-team player in the 2005 National League season and his good form of that season continued in the Super League 2006. He suffered a number of injuries in the promotion-winning season of 2007 but was a key member of the side in 2008. In May 2008, Huby signed a three-year extension to his contract, and, in March 2011, by then Castleford’s longest serving player, he signed a further three-year contract. A fractured kneecap, suffered in a match against St Helens in April 2011, ruled him out of the game for almost a year; he made his comeback against Featherstone in April 2012. He was granted a testimonial after ten years in the senior team with a game against Halifax on Boxing Day 2013. 

He played in the 2014 Challenge Cup Final defeat by the Leeds Rhinos at Wembley Stadium, two weeks after dislocating his elbow in the semifinal against the Widnes Vikings.

In September 2014, Huby joined the Huddersfield Giants on a four-year contract. He played in every game for Huddersfield during the 2015 season but suffered a broken wrist in training in December 2015 that required surgery and led to him missing the start of the 2016 season. He was allowed to leave in December 2016 and joined Wakefield Trinity on a three-year contract. A bad shoulder injury suffered during a match in February 2019 led to a lengthy layoff and Huby left Wakefield Trinity by mutual consent in July 2019.

References

External links
Wakefield Trinity profile
(archived by web.archive.org) Castleford Tigers profile
SL profile

1986 births
Living people
Castleford Tigers players
English rugby league players
Huddersfield Giants players
Rugby league players from Pontefract
Rugby league props
Wakefield Trinity players